Makers of the City is a 1990 book of essays by Lewis F. Fried about four writers who wrote about the American city: Jacob Riis, Lewis Mumford, James T. Farrell, and Paul Goodman.

References

External links 

 

1990 non-fiction books
English-language books
Books about urbanism
University of Massachusetts Press books